Viiksinselkä is a medium-sized lake in the Vuoksi main catchment area. It is located partly in the region of Northern Karelia in Finland and partly in Loimola municipality in Russia.

See also
List of lakes in Finland

References

Lakes of Ilomantsi